The 2023–24 UEFA Champions League will be the 69th season of Europe's premier club football tournament organised by UEFA, and the 32nd season since it was renamed from the European Champion Clubs' Cup to the UEFA Champions League.

The final will be played at the Wembley Stadium in London, United Kingdom. The winner of the 2023–24 UEFA Champions League will automatically qualify for the 2024–25 UEFA Champions League's league stage, and also earn the right to play against the winner of the 2023–24 UEFA Europa League in the 2024 UEFA Super Cup.

This edition will be the final season with the current format of 32 teams participating at the group stage, after UEFA announced that a brand new format would be introduced for the following edition.

Association team allocation
A total of 80 teams from 53 of the 55 UEFA member associations are set to participate in the 2023–24 UEFA Champions League (the exceptions being Liechtenstein, which does not organise a domestic league and Russia). The association ranking based on the UEFA association coefficients is used to determine the number of participating teams for each association:
Associations 1–4 each have four teams qualify.
Associations 5–6 each have three teams qualify.
Associations 7–15 (except Russia) each have two teams qualify.
Associations 16–55 (except Liechtenstein) each have one team qualify.
The winners of the 2022–23 UEFA Champions League and 2022–23 UEFA Europa League are each given an additional entry if they do not qualify for the 2023–24 UEFA Champions League through their domestic league.

Association ranking
For the 2023–24 UEFA Champions League, the associations are allocated places according to their 2022 UEFA association coefficients, which takes into account their performance in European competitions from 2017–18 to 2021–22. The team allocation reflects Russia's ongoing suspension from UEFA competitions.

Apart from the allocation based on the association coefficients, associations may have additional teams participating in the Champions League, as noted below:
 – Additional berth for UEFA Europa League title holders

Distribution
The following is the default access list for the 2023–24 season.

Due to the suspension of Russia for the 2023–24 European season, the following changes to the access list have been made:

The champions of association 11 (Serbia) enter the group stage instead of the play-off round (Champions Path).
The champions of association 13 (Belgium) enter the play-off round instead of the third qualifying round (Champions Path).
The champions of association 15 (Greece) enter the third qualifying round instead of the second qualifying round (Champions Path).
The champions of associations 18 (Denmark) and 19 (Croatia) enter the second qualifying round instead of the first qualifying round (Champions Path).
The runner-up of association 11 (Serbia) enter the third qualifying round instead of the second qualifying round (League Path).

Teams
The labels in the parentheses show how each team qualified for the place of its starting round:
TH: Champions League title holders
EL: Europa League title holders
1st, 2nd, 3rd, 4th: League positions of the previous season

The second qualifying round, third qualifying round and play-off round are divided into Champions Path (CH) and League Path (LP).

Notes

Schedule
The schedule of the competition is as follows. All matches are played on Tuesdays and Wednesdays apart from the preliminary round final and the final.

See also
2023–24 UEFA Europa League
2023–24 UEFA Europa Conference League
2024 UEFA Super Cup
2023–24 UEFA Women's Champions League
2023–24 UEFA Youth League

References

External links

 
1
2023-24
UEFA Champions